RFA Lady Cory-Wright was a cargo steamship that had been built as a civilian collier in 1906, became a mine carrier in 1914 and was torpedoed and sunk with significant loss of life in 1918.

History
SP Austin & Son Ltd of Sunderland built her in 1906 for William Cory and Son. She was named Lady Cory-Wright after either Lady Mima, wife of Sir Cory Cory-Wright, 1st Baronet or Lady Elizabeth, wife of Sir Arthur Cory-Wright, 2nd Baronet.

In August 1914 the War Department requisitioned Lady Cory-Wright who used her as a mine carrier. On 26 March 1918 she was in the English Channel steaming from Plymouth to Malta laden with a cargo that included 2,762 mines, 370 depth charges, 2,100 torpedo detonators and 1,000 primers B.E. when the  torpedoed her about 14 miles off The Lizard. Lady Cory-Wrights Master and all but one of her crew were killed.

After Lady Cory-Wright sank many of her mines were left floating in the area, and her one survivor reportedly was found clinging to a floating mine. In 2009 her wreck still contained many unexploded mines and detonators.

References

1906 ships
Ships built on the River Wear
Steamships of the United Kingdom
Ships of the Royal Fleet Auxiliary
Maritime incidents in 1918
Ships sunk by German submarines in World War I
World War I shipwrecks in the English Channel